Judith   is a play written in 1931 by French dramatist Jean Giraudoux.

Synopsis
In ancient Palestine, an Assyrian army is attacking a community of Jewish people. The Assyrians are led by Holofernes. The Jews see their own doom coming, and they believe that they can be saved only if the fairest and purest one of their women is sent to Holofernes to plead to spare them. They pick Judith–a virgin, 20 years old, beautiful, brilliant and wealthy.

Judith doesn’t want to go–she thinks the mission she’s being sent on is ridiculous and based on superstition. But confronted with the possibility that her country might be destroyed, she agrees to try it. A captain in the Jewish army named John wants to marry her. He sends a prostitute to Holofernes, who will pretend to be Judith. But Judith gets to Holofernes’ tent first. One of Holofernes’ officers, Egon, a pederast, is persuaded by the prostitute to disguise himself as Holofernes. Judith is taken in by this trick, and feels humiliation and failure. Then Holofernes arrives, but Judith is not able to make her plea of sparing her fellow Jewish people. Holofernes attempts to seducer Judith, she agrees to go to his bed, and she kills him there.

Original productions
Judith was translated into English by John K. Savacool, in The Modern Theatre, ed. Eric Bentley, vol. 3 (1955), and by Christopher Fry, in The Drama of Jean Giraudoux, vol. 1 (1963).

Judith was first performed on 4 November 1931 in Paris at the Théâtre Pigalle in a production by Louis Jouvet.

References

External links
 

Plays by Jean Giraudoux
1931 plays
Cultural depictions of Judith
Plays based on the Bible